Karen Cudrio (1716-1797) was a Norwegian businessperson. She was a major wood merchant trader in Østmarka, having inherited the trade as a widow in 1765. She was a well known historical figure and became the subject of legends and local folklore.

References 

1716 births
1797 deaths
18th-century Norwegian businesspeople
18th-century Norwegian businesswomen